Eric Chalmers Brown (15 February 1925 – 6 March 1986) was a Scottish professional golfer.

Eric Brown was born in Edinburgh. Aged fifteen months he moved to Bathgate, when his father George got a job as a technical-subjects teacher. Eric stayed in Stuart Terrace and played at the golf course across the road. He represented Great Britain in the Ryder Cup in 1953, 1955, 1957 and 1959 and had a 4–4–0 win–loss–half record. He won all of his four singles matches but lost his four foursomes matches. He topped the European Order of Merit in 1957. He was the non-playing captain of the British Ryder Cup teams in 1969 and 1971. He won the Scottish PGA Championship eight times between 1956 and 1968.

In March 1986, Brown died of a stroke at his home in Edinburgh.

Amateur wins
This list may be incomplete.
1946 Scottish Amateur

Professional wins (27)
These lists may be incomplete.

Great Britain and Ireland wins (24)
1950 Northern Open
1952 Penfold Tournament
1953 Irish Open, Northern Open
1954 Northern Open
1955 Northern Open
1956 Stuart C. Goodwin Tournament (tie with John Fallon), Scottish Professional Championship
1957 Dunlop Masters, Gleneagles-Saxone Foursomes Tournament (with George Will), Northern Open, Scottish Professional Championship
1958 Yorkshire Evening News Tournament (tie with Harold Henning), Hennessy Tournament, Scottish Professional Championship
1960 News of the World Match Play, Dunlop Tournament (tie with Ralph Moffitt), Scottish Professional Championship
1962 News of the World Match Play, Scottish Professional Championship
1965 Scottish Professional Championship
1966 Scottish Professional Championship (tie with John Panton), Cutty Sark Tournament
1968 Scottish Professional Championship

European wins (3)
1951 Swiss Open
1952 Italian Open
1953 Portuguese Open

Results in major championships

Note: Brown only played in The Open Championship.

CUT = missed the half-way cut
WD = Withdrew
"T" indicates a tie for a place

Team appearances
Ryder Cup (representing Great Britain): 1953, 1955, 1957 (winners), 1959
World Cup (representing Scotland): 1954, 1955, 1956, 1957, 1958, 1959, 1960, 1961, 1962, 1965, 1966, 1967, 1968
Joy Cup (representing the British Isles): 1954 (winners), 1955 (winners), 1956 (winners), 1958 (winners)
Amateurs–Professionals Match (representing the Professionals): 1957 (winners), 1958
R.T.V. International Trophy (representing Scotland): 1967
Double Diamond International (representing Scotland): 1971 (captain), 1972 (captain), 1973 (winners, captain)

References

External links
Golf Tournament results – Eric Brown at where2golf.com

Scottish male golfers
Ryder Cup competitors for Europe
Golfers from Edinburgh
People from Bathgate
Sportspeople from West Lothian
1925 births
1986 deaths